PT Wings Surya, or known as Wings Group and simply Wings, is an Indonesian consumer goods company based in Surabaya. The company was founded in 1948 under the name Fa Wings. In 1991 it was renamed the Solar Wings. Wings produces products including toilet soap, powder and detergent bars, floorcleaners, fabric softeners, and sanitary napkins for markets throughout Indonesia and beyond. In 1981, while the third factory PT. Cipta Segar Harum (later renamed PT. Lionindo Jaya since 1990 and re-renamed PT Lion Wings since 2004) was built in Jakarta together with Lion Corporation Japan to produce brands such as Emeron, Page One, Ciptadent and Mama. Their products include shampoo, shower gel, skin care products, toothpaste, and liquid dishwashing.

History 
In 1948, when Johannes Ferdinand Katuari (Oen Jong Khing) and Harjo Sutanto (Tan Siek Miauw), co-founders of Wings began a business using limited resources in their backyard to create a simple laundry soap. Katuari and Sutanto operated out of a small and sparse workshop in their home in Surabaya, East Java. Driven by the need to survive the post-war years, the two founders resolutely peddled their products from door to door, stall to stall, village to village. Their determination paid off; the laundry soap was well received by the community. The success spurred Katuari and Sutanto to expand their business, and more importantly, to develop more effective detergent formulations.

The two entrepreneurs later started producing cream detergent, which quickly became a basic necessity for the East Java people. Cream detergent is an innovative product that is not found anywhere else. It has the cleaning power of detergent, but is much cheaper than conventional detergent (powder detergent) due to low energy cost and low investment cost of machinery. The product was an instant hit as it introduced a very practical and economical way of doing laundry for the average Indonesian family. Within a couple of years, it became widely popular through extensive promotions throughout Java and soon after, the whole of Indonesia.

Katuari and Sutanto had named their business venture Wings, drawing inspiration and personification from Mother Nature. The founders worked like a “pair of wings” and shared the same values and aspirations. The name reflects their vision which spells “the sky’s the limit” when it comes to developing a business based on an acute awareness of consumer needs, diligence and integrity.

In 1981, Wings expanded their business while the third factory PT. Cipta Segar Harum (later renamed PT. Lionindo Jaya since 1990 and re-renamed PT Lion Wings since 2004) was built in Jakarta together with Lion Corporation Japan to produce brands such as Emeron, Page One, Ciptadent and Mama. Their products include shampoo, shower gel, skin care products, toothpaste, and liquid dishwashing.

In 1991 it was renamed the Solar Wings. Wings produces products including toilet soap, powder and detergent bars, floorcleaners, fabric softeners, and sanitary napkins for markets throughout Indonesia and beyond.

Products

Wings Soap 
 Powder Detergent
 Boom
 Daia
 So Klin
 Pewangi So Klin 
 Pewangi Reguler
 Pewangi Sekali Bilas
 Softener So Klin
 Softener Reguler
 Softener Sekali Bilas
 Liquid Detergent
 So Klin Liquid
 Cream Detergent
 Ekonomi
 Wings
 Dangdut
 Boom
 So Klin Fresly
 So Klin Rapika

Wings Household 
 So Klin Lantai
 Wings Porcelain (WPC)
 Super Sol

Lion Wings 
 Ciptadent Toothpaste and Toothbrush
 Systema Toothpaste, Mouthwash and Toothbrush
 Botanical
 Lavenda
 Emeron Nutritive Shampoo
 Emeron Hand and Body Lotion
 Emeron Lovely
 Sidia Hand and Body Lotion
 Kodomo
 Zinc Anti Dandruff Shampoo
 Zinc Hair Stylish Gel
 Zact toothpaste
 Mama Dishwashing Liquid
 Serasoft Shampoo and Conditioner
 Posh Perfumed Body Spray
 Posh Deodorant Roll-On
 Poise Luminous White Day Cream and Facial Foam

Wings Care 
 GIV barsoap and liquid soap
 Fres and Natural barsoap and liquid soap
 Fres and Natural fragrance (Lion Wings)
 NUVO Health barsoap, liquid soap and hand-sanitizer
 Hers Protex
 Baby Happy
 K Natural White
 Wings Protector
 Wizz 24 Disinfectant

Wings Food 
 Ale-Ale
 Enerjos
 Floridina
 Milk Jus
 Jas Jus
 Kecap Sedaap
 Eko Mie
 Mie Sedaap
Mie Sedaap Cup
 Mie Sukses's
 Mie Sedaap Tasty
 Soyumie Gelas
 Power F
 Segar Dingin (SDC-1000)
 Teh Javana
 Tea Jus
 Teh Rio
 Top Coffee
 Top White Coffee
 Isoplus
 Golda Coffee

Calbee Wings 
 Potabee
 Krisbee
 Japota
 Guribee

Glico Wings 
 Waku Waku
 J-Cone
 Frost Bite
 Haku

References

External links 
 

Companies based in Surabaya
Dental companies
Food and drink companies established in 1948
Food and drink companies of Indonesia
Indonesian brands
Indonesian companies established in 1948
Manufacturing companies established in 1948
Manufacturing companies of Indonesia
Personal care companies
Privately held companies of Indonesia